Walter Young was a snowshoe racer and runner from Quebec, Canada. He won the 1937 Boston Marathon in a time of 2:33:20 during unseasonably hot conditions. Young defeated the second place runner, John A. Kelley, by over six minutes.

Young later worked as a firefighter. He was a captain with the Verdun, Quebec fire department until his retirement in 1978. Upon his wife's death in 1996 he relocated to Mission, British Columbia to be with his son.

References

1913 births
2004 deaths
Sportspeople from Quebec
Boston Marathon male winners
Canadian male marathon runners
Athletes (track and field) at the 1938 British Empire Games
Canadian male long-distance runners